HMS Monnow was a  of the Royal Navy. The frigate served as a convoy escort in the Battle of the Atlantic during the Second World War. Named for the River Monnow in the United Kingdom, the vessel was transferred to the Royal Canadian Navy in 1944, keeping the same name, and finished the war with them. Returned to the Royal Navy following the war, it was sold to the Royal Danish Navy and renamed Holger Danske. It served until 1960 when it was scrapped. The ship is significant as it is one of the few ships employed by the Royal Canadian Navy never to visit Canada.

Service history

Royal Navy
Monnow was ordered on 26 December 1942 as part of the River-class building programme. The keel was laid down on 28 September 1943 by Charles Hill & Sons at Bristol. The vessel was launched on 4 December 1943. The ship was commissioned into the Royal Navy on 11 May 1944 with the pennant number K 441. After commissioning, Monnow worked up at Tobermory and served only a few months in the Royal Navy before being transferred officially to the Royal Canadian Navy on 3 August 1944.

Returned to the Royal Navy on 11 June 1945, Monnow was never reactivated in the Royal Navy and was instead sold to the Royal Danish Navy in October 1945.

Royal Canadian Navy
After the official transfer, Monnow was assigned to the convoy escort group EG 9 based in Londonderry. The frigate spent the majority of its wartime career in British waters with the exception of one convoy round trip to Gibraltar in October 1944. In November 1944, the ship escorted convoy JW 62 to Kola Inlet in Russia and returned to the United Kingdom escorting RA 62.

From 14 March to 20 April 1945, Monnow deployed with the 9th Escort Group in the English Channel. While escorting convoy JW 67 in May 1945, Monnow was detached to escort surrendered U-boats departing Trondheim and making for Loch Eriboll. At the end of the month, the frigate sailed for Sheerness where Monnow was paid off and returned to the Royal Navy on 11 June 1945.

Royal Danish Navy
The Royal Danish Navy acquired Monnow in October 1945. The frigate was renamed Holger Danske and commissioned 20 October 1945. During its service with the Danish, the ship's main armament was upgraded in 1948 from 4-inch single mounts to 5-inch single mounts. The frigate was mainly used for training purposes. The ship was decommissioned 1 August 1959 and broken up at Odense, Denmark in 1960.

References

Notes

Footnotes

References

External links

 

Ships of the Royal Canadian Navy
1943 ships
Ships built in Bristol
River-class frigates of the Royal Navy